Gelora Haji Agus Salim Stadium is a multi-use stadium in Padang, West Sumatra, Indonesia. It is currently used mostly for Football matches and is the home stadium of Semen Padang and PSP Padang. The stadium has a capacity of 20,000. The stadium is also known as a venue for rugby union matches and athletics.

History
The stadium was named after Agus Salim, a Muslim intellectual and national hero of Minangkabau from the area where the stadium is located. The 2009 Sumatra earthquakes heavily damaged the stadium. The stands were destroyed and there was damage to facilities, including lighting. The dressing rooms were also damaged, and the resultant condition of the field rendered the stadium unfit for use. Repairs were completed in 2012.

Structure and facilities 
The stadium has 4 tribune categories for spectators, west for VIPs with single seats, east for public, south for Spartacks and north for The Kmers.

See also 
List of stadiums in Indonesia

References

External links 
 http://www.worldstadiums.com/asia/countries/indonesia.shtml 

Football venues in Indonesia
Rugby union stadiums in Indonesia
Padang
Sport in West Sumatra
Buildings and structures in West Sumatra
Sports venues completed in 1985
1985 establishments in Indonesia